This is a list of notable roller derby leagues, and may include those that are no longer in existence. Existence dates, where known, are included to provide a timeline charting the sport's growth cycles. The list may currently make distinctions according to each organization's professional/amateur business structure and active/defunct status, and is subdivided by gender (female or male-only, or co-ed) and age (adult versus junior). Within each subcategory, leagues are then listed according to region, by country and city. Countries with larger numbers of leagues, such as the United States and Canada, are further subdivided by state and province.

Women's leagues

All are flat track unless otherwise indicated.

Argentina
 Buenos Aires – 2x4 Roller Derby

Australia

Australian Capital Territory
 Canberra – Canberra Roller Derby League
 Canberra – Varsity Derby League

New South Wales
 Newcastle – Newcastle Roller Derby League
 Sydney – Sydney Roller Derby League
 Wollongong/Illawarra – Wollongong Illawarra Roller Derby

Queensland

 Brisbane – Brisbane City Rollers
 Brisbane – Northern Brisbane Rollers
 Brisbane – Sun State Roller Derby

South Australia
 Adelaide – Adelaide Roller Derby

Tasmania
 Hobart – Convict City Roller Derby League

Victoria
 Ballarat – Ballarat Roller Derby League
 Geelong – Geelong Roller Derby League
 Melbourne – South Sea Roller Derby
 Melbourne – Victorian Roller Derby League

Western Australia
 Perth – Perth Roller Derby
 Perth – Western Australia Roller Derby

Belgium
 Antwerp – One Love Roller Dolls
 Ghent – Go-Go Gent Roller Derby
 Namur – Namur Roller Girls

Canada

Alberta
 Calgary – Calgary Roller Derby
 Edmonton – E-Ville Roller Derby
 Edmonton – Oil City Roller Derby

British Columbia
 Vancouver – Terminal City Roller Derby
 Victoria – Eves of Destruction
 West Kootenays – West Kootenay Roller Derby

New Brunswick
 Moncton – Muddy River Rollers
 Saint John – Fog City Rollers

Nova Scotia
 Halifax – Anchor City Rollers

Ontario
 Alliston – Renegade Derby Dames
 Guelph – Royal City Roller Derby
 Hamilton – Hammer City Roller Derby
 Kitchener – Waterloo Area – Tri-City Roller Derby
 London – Forest City Roller Derby
 Ottawa – Ottawa Valley Roller Derby
 Toronto – Hogtown Roller Derby
 Toronto – Toronto Roller Derby
 Windsor – Windsor Roller Derby
 Woodstock – Woodstock Roller Derby

Quebec
 Montreal – Montreal Roller Derby

Colombia
 Bogotá – Rock and Roller Queens

Denmark
 Copenhagen – Copenhagen Roller Derby

Finland
 Helsinki – Helsinki Roller Derby
 Helsinki – Kallio Rolling Rainbow

France
 Bordeaux – Roller Derby Bordeaux
 Nantes – Nantes Roller Derby
 Paris – Paris Roller Derby
 Toulouse – Roller Derby Toulouse
 Mérignac – SAM Roller Derby
 Lomme – Lomme Roller Girls
 Orcet – Orcet Roller Derby
 Tours – Roller Derby Tours

Germany 
 Berlin – Bear City Roller Derby
 Essen – Ruhrpott Roller Girls
 Hamburg – Harbor Girls Hamburg
 Kaiserslautern – Roller Girls of the Apocalypse
 Stuttgart – Stuttgart Valley Roller Derby

Ireland
 Cork – Cork City Firebirds
 Dublin – Dublin Roller Derby

Japan
 Tokyo – Tokyo Roller Girls
 Okinawa – Okinawa Roller Derby

Netherlands
 Amsterdam – Amsterdam Roller Derby

New Zealand
 Auckland – Auckland Roller Derby League
 Auckland – Pirate City Rollers
 Christchurch – Dead End Derby
 Hamilton – Hellmilton Roller Ghouls
 Palmerston North – Swamp City Roller Derby
 Wellington – Richter City Roller Derby
 Whangarei – Northland Nightmares

Norway
 Trondheim – Nidaros Roller Derby

Sweden
 Gothenburg – Gothenburg Roller Derby
 Malmö – Crime City Rollers
 Stockholm – Stockholm Roller Derby

United Kingdom

England
 Barrow-in-Furness, Cumbria – Furness Roller Derby
 Bath, Somerset – Bath Roller Derby
 Basingstoke, Hampshire – Basingstoke Bullets Roller Derby
 Bedford, Bedfordshire – Bedfordshire Roller Derby
 Birmingham, West Midlands – Birmingham Roller Derby
 Birmingham, West Midlands – Crash Test Brummies
 Blackpool, Lancashire – Blackpool Roller Derby
 Brighton, East Sussex – Brighton Rockers Roller Derby
 Bristol – Bristol Roller Derby
 Cambridge, Cambridgeshire – Cambridge Rollerbillies
 Chelmsford, Essex – Killahurtz Roller Derby
 Coventry, West Midlands – Coventry Roller Derby
 Crewe, Cheshire – Railtown Loco Rollers
 Devon and Somerset – SWAT Roller Derby
 Eastbourne, East Sussex – Bourne Bombshells
 Exeter, Devon – Exeter Roller Derby
 Gloucester, Gloucestershire – Severn Roller Torrent
 Guildford, Surrey – Surrey Rollergirls, Surrey Roller Boys
 Harrogate, North Yorkshire – Spa Town Roller Derby
 Hemel Hempstead, Hertfordshire – Hertfordshire Roller Derby
 Hereford, Herefordshire – Hereford Roller Derby
 Herne Bay, Kent – Kent Roller Derby
 High Wycombe, Buckinghamshire – Big Bucks High Rollers
 Hull, East Yorkshire – Hull's Angels Rolller Derby
 Leeds, West Yorkshire – Leeds Roller Derby
 Leicester, Leicestershire – Dolly Rockit Rollers
 Leicester, Leicestershire – Roller Derby Leicester
 Lincoln, Lincolnshire – Lincolnshire Bombers Roller Derby
 Lincoln, Lincolnshire – The Imposters Roller Girls
 Lincoln, Lincolnshire – Lincolnshire Rolling Thunder
 Liverpool, Merseyside – Liverpool Roller Birds
 London, Greater London – London Rockin' Rollers
 London, Greater London – London Roller Derby
 London, Greater London – Southern Discomfort Roller Derby
 Manchester, Greater Manchester – Manchester Roller Derby
 Middlesbrough, North Yorkshire – Middlesbrough Roller Derby
 Milton Keynes, Buckinghamshire – Rebellion Roller Derby, Milton Keynes Roller Derby
 Newcastle upon Tyne, Tyne and Wear – Newcastle Roller Derby
 Newcastle upon Tyne, Tyne and Wear – Tyne and Fear Roller Derby
 Northampton, Northamptonshire – Vendetta Vixens
 Norwich, Norfolk – Norfolk Roller Derby
 Nottingham, Nottinghamshire – Nottingham Hellfire Harlots
 Nottingham, Nottinghamshire – Nottingham Roller Derby
 Nottingham, Nottinghamshire – East Midlands Open Roller Derby
 Oldham, Greater Manchester – Rainy City Roller Derby
 Oxford, Oxfordshire – Oxford Roller Derby
 Oxford, Oxfordshire – Oxford Wheels of Gory
 Plymouth, Devon – Plymouth City Roller Derby
 Portsmouth, Hampshire – Portsmouth Roller Wenches
 Preston, Lancashire – Preston Roller Girls
 Rochester, Kent – Kent Men's Roller Derby
 Rochester, Kent – Apex Predators Roller Derby
 Sheffield, South Yorkshire – Sheffield Steel Roller Derby
 Sheffield, South Yorkshire – The Inhuman League
 Stevenage, Hertfordshire – Full Metal Roller Derby
 Southampton, Hampshire – Southampton City Rollers
 Sunderland, Tyne and Wear – Sunderland Roller Derby
 Swindon, Wiltshire – Wiltshire Roller Derby
 Wakefield, West Yorkshire – Wakey Wheeled Cats
 Windsor, Berkshire – Royal Windsor Roller Derby
 Wirral, Merseyside – Riverside Rebels Roller Derby
 Wirral, Merseyside – Wirral Roller Derby
 Worcester, Worcestershire – Worcester Wyldlings Roller Derby
 Wolverhampton, West Midlands –Wolverhampton Honour Rollers

Northern Ireland
 Belfast – Belfast City Rockets
 Belfast – Belfast Roller Derby

Scotland
 Aberdeen – Granite City Roller Derby, Granite City Brawlers
 Edinburgh – Auld Reekie Roller Derby, Demonburgh Junior Roller Derby
 Glasgow – Glasgow Roller Derby, Mean City Roller Derby, Glasgow Men's Roller Derby

Wales
 Cardiff – Tiger Bay Brawlers, Cardiff Roller Collective
 Newport – Riot City Ravens

United States

Alabama
 Birmingham – Tragic City Rollers
 Huntsville – Rocket City Roller Derby

Alaska
 Anchorage – Rage City Roller Derby
 Fairbanks – Fairbanks Rollergirls

Arizona
 Phoenix – Arizona Derby Dames
 Phoenix – Arizona Roller Derby
 Tucson – Tucson Roller Derby 2003–present

Arkansas
 Fayetteville – NWA Roller Derby

California
 Bakersfield – Derby Revolution of Bakersfield
 Eureka – Humboldt Roller Derby
 Los Angeles – Angel City Derby
 Los Angeles – Los Angeles Derby Dolls
 Oakland – Bay Area Derby
 Orange County – Orange County Roller Derby
 Sacramento – Sacramento Roller Derby
 San Diego – San Diego Derby United
 San Jose – Silicon Valley Roller Girls
 San Luis Obispo – Central Coast Roller Derby
 Santa Cruz – Santa Cruz Derby Girls
 Ventura – Ventura County Derby Darlins

Colorado
 Boulder – Boulder County Bombers
 Castle Rock – Castle Rock 'n' Rollers
 Colorado Springs – Pikes Peak Derby Dames
 Denver – Denver Roller Derby
 Denver – Rocky Mountain Rollergirls
 Fort Collins – FoCo Roller Derby
 Greeley – Slaughterhouse Derby Girls
 Pueblo – SoCo Derby Dollz

Connecticut
 Hartford – Hartford Area Roller Derby
 Waterbury – Connecticut Roller Derby

Delaware
 Wilmington – Diamond State Roller Derby

District of Columbia
 Washington, D.C. – DC Rollergirls

Florida
 Fort Lauderdale – Gold Coast Derby Grrls
 Fort Myers – Fort Myers Roller Derby
 Jacksonville – Jacksonville Roller Derby
 Lakeland – Lakeland Derby Dames
 Pinellas Park – Deadly Rival Roller Derby
 Tallahassee – Tallahassee Rollergirls
 Tampa – Tampa Roller Derby

Georgia
 Athens – Classic City Rollergirls
 Atlanta – Atlanta Roller Derby
 Augusta – Soul City Sirens

Hawaii
 Hilo – Paradise Roller Girls
 Honolulu – Pacific Roller Derby

Idaho
 Boise – Treasure Valley Rollergirls

Illinois
 Champaign – Twin City Derby Girls
 Chicago – Chicago Outfit Roller Derby
 Chicago – Windy City Rollers
 Marion – Southern Illinois Roller Girls
 Rockford – Rockford Rage
 Springfield – Midstate Mayhem Roller Derby

Indiana
 Bloomington – Bleeding Heartland Roller Derby
 Evansville – Demolition City Roller Derby
 Fort Wayne – Fort Wayne Derby Girls
 Indianapolis – Circle City Roller Derby
 Indianapolis – Naptown Roller Derby
 Lafayette – Lafayette Roller Derby

Iowa
 Cedar Rapids – Cedar Rapids RollerGirls
 Des Moines – Des Moines Derby Dames
 Des Moines – Mid Iowa Rollers
 Iowa City – Old Capitol City Roller Derby
 Oskaloosa – Mahaska Mayhem
 Sioux City – Sioux City Roller Dames

Kansas
 Wichita – ICT Roller Derby

Kentucky
 Bowling Green – Vette City Roller Derby
 Covington – Black-n-Bluegrass RollerGirls
 Lexington – Roller Derby of Central Kentucky
 Louisville – Derby City Roller Girls

Louisiana
 Baton Rouge – Red Stick Roller Derby
 Houma – Cajun Rollergirls
 New Orleans – Big Easy Rollergirls

Maine
 Bangor – Central Maine Derby
 Portland – Maine Roller Derby
 Rockland – Rock Coast Rollers

Maryland
 Baltimore – Charm City Roller Derby
 Hagerstown – Mason-Dixon Roller Vixens
 Salisbury – Salisbury Roller Girls
 Waldorf – Southern Maryland Roller Derby

Massachusetts
 Boston – Boston Roller Derby
 Fitchburg/Leominster – Bay State Brawlers Roller Derby
 Northampton – Pioneer Valley Roller Derby
 Wilbraham – Pair O'Dice City Rollers

Michigan
 Ann Arbor – Ann Arbor Roller Derby
 Detroit – Detroit Roller Derby
 Flint – Flint Roller Derby
 Grand Rapids – Grand Raggidy Roller Derby
 Kalamazoo – Kalamazoo Roller Derby
 Lansing – Lansing Derby Vixens

Minnesota
 Bemidji – Babe City Rollers
 Duluth – Harbor City Roller Derby
 Minneapolis – North Star Roller Derby
 St. Paul – Minnesota Roller Derby

Missouri
 Columbia – CoMo Derby Dames
 Kansas City – Kansas City Roller Warriors
 Springfield – Springfield Roller Derby
 St. Charles – St. Chux Derby Chix
 St. Louis – Arch Rival Roller Derby

Nebraska
 Lincoln – No Coast Derby Girls
 Omaha – Omaha Rollergirls

Nevada
 Las Vegas – Fabulous Sin City Roller Derby

New Hampshire
 Manchester – New Hampshire Roller Derby

New Jersey
 Newark – Garden State Rollergirls
 Toms River – Jersey Shore Roller Girls

New Mexico
 Albuquerque – Duke City Roller Derby

New York
 Albany – Albany All Stars Roller Derby
 Buffalo – Queen City Roller Derby
 Hyde Park – Hudson Valley Horrors Roller Derby
 Ithaca – Ithaca League of Women Rollers
 Long Island – Long Island Roller Rebels
 New York – Gotham Roller Derby
 Rochester – Roc City Roller Derby
 Syracuse – Salt City Roller Derby
 Troy – Hellions of Troy
 Utica – Central New York Roller Derby
 Yonkers – Suburbia Roller Derby

North Carolina
 Asheville – Blue Ridge Rollergirls
 Charlotte – Charlotte Roller Derby
 Greensboro – Greensboro Roller Derby
 Raleigh – Carolina Roller Derby
 Wilmington – Cape Fear Roller Girls

North Dakota
 Fargo – Fargo Moorhead Derby Girls

Ohio
 Akron – Akron Roller Derby
 Cincinnati – Cincinnati Rollergirls
 Cleveland – Burning River Roller Derby
 Columbus – Ohio Roller Derby
 Dayton – Gem City Roller Derby
 Toledo – Glass City Rollers

Oklahoma
 Oklahoma City – Oklahoma Victory Dolls
 Tulsa – Green Country Roller Girls

Oregon
 Bend – Lava City Roller Dolls
 Corvallis – Sick Town Derby Dames
 Eugene – Emerald City Roller Girls
 Portland – Rose City Rollers
 Salem – Cherry City Roller Derby

Pennsylvania
 Allentown – Lehigh Valley Roller Derby
 Downingtown – Brandywine Roller Derby
 Harrisburg – Harrisburg Area Roller Derby
 Lancaster – Dutchland Derby Rollers
 Philadelphia – Penn Jersey Roller Derby
 Philadelphia – Philly Roller Derby
 Pittsburgh – Steel City Roller Derby

Rhode Island
 Providence – Providence Roller Derby

South Carolina
 Charleston – Lowcountry Highrollers
 Columbia – Columbia Quadsquad
 Greenville – Greenville Derby Dames

South Dakota
 Sioux Falls – Sioux Falls Roller Dollz

Tennessee
 Chattanooga -Chattanooga Roller Girls
 Johnson City -Little City Roller Girls
 Knoxville – Hard Knox Roller Girls
 Memphis – Memphis Roller Derby
 Nashville – Nashville Roller Derby

Texas
 Austin – Texas Rollergirls
 Austin – Texas Roller Derby
 Beaumont – Spindletop Roller Girls
 Dallas – Assassination City Roller Derby
 Dallas – Dallas Derby Devils
 Houston – Houston Roller Derby
 Lubbock – West Texas Roller Derby
 San Antonio – Alamo City Rollergirls
 Tyler – East Texas Bombers

Utah
 Ogden – Junction City Roller Dolls
 Ogden – O-Town Derby Dames
 Salt Lake City – Salt City Derby Girls
 Salt Lake City – Wasatch Roller Derby

Vermont
 Burlington – Green Mountain Roller Derby

Virginia
 Charlottesville – Charlottesville Derby Dames
 Harrisonburg – Rocktown Rollers
 Richmond – River City Rollergirls
 Virginia Beach – Dominion Derby Girls

Washington
 Bellingham – Bellingham Roller Betties
 Everett – Jet City Roller Derby
 Joint Base Lewis-McChord – Bettie Brigade
 Olympia – Oly Rollers
 Port Orchard – Slaughter County Roller Vixens
 Seattle – Rat City Roller Derby
 Seattle – Tilted Thunder Rail Birds
 Spokane – Lilac City Roller Derby
 Tacoma – Dockyard Derby Dames

Wisconsin
 Appleton – Fox Cities Roller Derby
 Madison – Madison Roller Derby
 Milwaukee – Brewcity Bruisers

Wyoming
 Casper – A'Salt Creek Roller Girls
 Cheyenne – Cheyenne Roller Derby

Co-ed leagues

All are flat track unless otherwise indicated, and have separate men's and women's teams in addition to co-ed teams

United States

 Northampton, MA – Pioneer Valley Roller Derby
 Philadelphia, PA – Old School Derby Association
 Philadelphia, PA – Penn Jersey Roller Derby
 San Francisco, CA – American Roller Skating Derby

United Kingdom

 Manchester, UK – Manchester Roller Derby

Men's leagues
These teams are not part of co-ed leagues.

United States
 Baltimore, MD – Harm City Roller Derby
 Des Moines, IA - Your Mom Men's Derby
 Green Bay, WI – Green Bay Smackers
 Milwaukee, WI – Wisconsin United Roller Derby
 New Orleans – New Orleans Brass
 New York, NY – New York Shock Exchange
 Portland, OR – Portland Men's Roller Derby
 St. Louis, MO – St. Louis GateKeepers
 Tacoma, WA – Puget Sound Outcast Derby

Defunct amateur leagues
 Akron, OH - NEO Roller Derby (2007-2016) and Rubber City Rollergirls (2009-2016) merged to become Akron Roller Derby
 Burleigh Heads, Queensland, Australia – Paradise City Roller Derby
 Layton, UT – Davis Derby Dames (2006–2009) – split to form the O-Town Derby Dames and the Junction City Roller Dolls
 Orange County, CA – Orange County Demolition Divas – (2006–2007)

Defunct professional leagues 

 Transcontinental Roller Derby (1935–1973; renamed to Roller Derby)
 National Skating Derby (Roller Games) (1961–1975; see also RollerGames and Roller Games International)
 RollerGames (1989–1990; TV only)
 Roller Game League (RGL) (1990–2001?)
 National Roller Derby League (NRDL) – 1995–2004; initially promoted as Roller Derby Inc.; current site promotes the San Francisco Bay Bombers, etc.
 American Roller Derby League (ARDL) – 1997–2003; Owned by Tim Patten; briefly promoted as American Inline Roller Skating Derby League; Promoted the Bay City Bombers
 World Skating League (WSL) / RollerJam (1998–2000; TV only)

References

External links

 Roller Derby AU – A list of active leagues in Australia.